Leonard J. Umnus (April 18, 1903 – April 13, 1996) was an American football, basketball, and baseball coach.

Playing career
Umnus enrolled at the University of Illinois in the fall of 1921.  While at Illinois he played football with Red Grange under coach Robert Zuppke.  Umnus was awarded "letters" for three years as a center and guard.  He also was awarded athletic letters for Illinois in boxing.

Coaching career

Wichita State
Umnus was the 15th head football coach at Fairmont College—now known as Wichita State University—in Wichita, Kansas and he held that position for three seasons, from 1925 until 1927, compiling a record of 12–7–4. Fairmont College became the Municipal University of Wichita in 1926.

Jordan College
Between coaching in Wichita and Northwestern College, Umnus started the football program at the now defunct Jordan College in Menominee, Michigan.

Northwestern College
Umnus later coached the Northwestern College Trojans in Watertown, Wisconsin (now a part of Martin Luther College in New Ulm, Minnesota).  He was the head coach at the school for 35 seasons and his teams produced a record of 135–64–9.  At Northwestern, he coached all sports including baseball and basketball.

Head coaching record

Football

References

1903 births
1996 deaths
American football guards
Basketball coaches from Michigan
Illinois Fighting Illini football players
Wichita State Shockers football coaches
Wichita State Shockers men's basketball coaches
Illinois Fighting Illini boxers
People from Menominee, Michigan
Players of American football from Michigan